The format of telephone numbers in Australia has changed over time to allow for the expansion of the subscriber base as technology has improved.

Introduction of area codes (pre-1990s)
The introduction of subscriber trunk dialling was slow, partly because of the distances of exchanges in some areas and partly due to the use of manual exchanges well into the 1980s. Initially, dialing codes covered a very small area, sometimes only one exchange, but gradually exchanges conglomerated to become large area codes. The length of codes varied; as early as 1971, some localities had area codes as long as seven digits, while the state capitals had two-digit area codes. By 1989, the system had been standardised to three-digit codes across the board, with two digit codes in the major cities. Only Kangaroo Island retained its four-digit code.

The digit following the leading zero was chosen to represent a rough geographic area, with the following numbers:

 00:  Tasmania (but also used for emergency (000), freecall (008), premium rate (0055), international access (0011) and other special numbers)
 01:  Mobile phone, pager, information and operator services
 02:  Sydney
 03:  Melbourne
 04:  New South Wales regional areas roughly within 250 km of Sydney (from 1992 041x was/is used for GSM mobile phones)
 05:  Victoria regional areas and South Western New South Wales Murray River border areas downstream of Rutherglen
 06:  Australian Capital Territory, New South Wales regional areas outside the 04 codes and some far North Eastern parts of Victoria.
 07:  Queensland
 08:  South Australia and the Northern Territory
 09:  Western Australia, Christmas Island and the Cocos Keeling Islands

By 1994, there were six area codes of two digits covering Sydney (02), Melbourne (03), Canberra (06), Brisbane (07), Adelaide (08) and Perth (09), 48 area codes of three digits, from (002) covering Hobart to (099) covering mid-west Western Australia, and one area code of four digits, Kangaroo Island (0848), which was not incorporated into a larger area code before 1994.

To dial these numbers from overseas, one omitted the leading zero. In the case of numbers in the 00 range, only the first zero was omitted: Hobart was +61 02 xx xxxx this was a potential cause of confusion with the Sydney area code (+61 2 xxx xxxx or +61 2 xx xxxx). The 007 range was used for satellite phones and "0G" mobile phones. Even as late as 2005 there was confusion: the prefixes +61 78 and +61 79 were listed as a "mobile phone number" on some call rates, even though the prefix was +61 07x and had not been used for over a decade.

In late March 1990, Canberra's area code changed from (062) to (06) by integrating the 2 into the subscriber number, thus allowing 200 000 more numbers to be registered.

Renumbering (1994–1998)
In Australia, as in other countries, due to the increase in subscriber uptake of services such as extra telephone lines in homes, mobile phones and other services, the previous numbering plan was being stretched to its limit. It was decided to reduce the number of area codes and lengthen all subscriber numbers by one or two digits. This occurred between 1994 and 1998, and was done progressively to ensure as little inconvenience and confusion as possible. The gradual change was also to avoid number clashes, a situation where two subscribers in two completely different locations have technically the same telephone number if dialed in their entirety. The first numbers to be converted to eight digits were numbers in the 99x xxxx and 99 xxxx ranges in the suburb of Mona Vale in Sydney, which all became 999x xxxx or 9999 xxxx on 25 July 1994. The final codes changed to eight digits were the Queensland (070), (071), (076), (077) and (079) codes, which all changed to (07) 4yxx xxxx on 10 November 1997.

In almost all cases, the former area code was incorporated into the new subscriber number: Canberra numbers went from (06) 2xx xxxx to (02) 62xx xxxx, numbers in the Northern Territory went from (089) xx xxxx to (08) 89xx xxxx, Regional Victoria went from 05x xxx xxx to 03 5xxx xxxx and so on. The four major exceptions were the two cities of Sydney and Melbourne, which added a 9 to the beginning of subscriber numbers; Tasmania, which became part of the (03) 6xxx xxxx range; and Queensland, which spread its area codes across a wide number range so that (07) 3... covers Brisbane, (07) 5... covers the surrounds including Esk and the Gold and Sunshine coasts, and (07) 4... covers the rest of the state. In Melbourne and Sydney, new non-geographic 90xx xxxx and 91xx xxxx ranges became available. Canberra also got a new 61xx xxxx range. Until November 1998, the only mobile numbers available were in the 040x and 041x ranges, to allow time for the existing 04x area codes (then New South Welsh regional codes) to be converted to (02) 4xxx xxxx numbers.

During the period of changeover, Australians were often told they were required to dial the entire telephone number they were calling, including the area code, even though the number may have been within the same area code. For example, a caller in Sydney with the number (02) 9xxx xxxx would need to dial (02) 49xx xxxx to call a number in Newcastle, despite the area code being the same. This was in order to avoid possible number clashes. Although this practice officially ceased on 1 March 1999, many still believe they are required to dial an area code outside their own telephone book area, but this is not the case.

Area Code boundaries do not always follow state boundaries, Along the Murray River New South Wales / Victoria state boundary 02 stretches south into Victoria for up to 50km upstream of Rutherglen while 03 a similar distance north into New South Wales downstream of Rutherglen. Broken Hill has an Area Code of 08 despite being geographically in New South Wales.

Former area codes and systems of change
Note: the number ranges given below do not include all current numbers in a given area. See the Australian telephone numbering plan for more information.

Minor changes
The South Eastern New South Wales corner had previously been split into two area code regions each with four digits, (0648) and (0649). These were centred on Cooma and the Snowy Mountains region and Bega and the Far South Coast region, respectively. The regions only had 5 digit (xxxxx) local numbers until they were up graded and the numbers were changed to 6 digits. This resulted in the numbers becoming (064) 5xxxxx for Cooma/Snowy Mountains region and (064) 9xxxxx for Bega/Far South Coast region.  When phone numbers were changed to 8 digits these two regions became (02) 64xxxxxx numbers.

Kangaroo Island was the only area in Australia that wasn't integrated into a larger area code before the change to eight-digit phone numbering, and had the only four-digit area code, (0848). The Kangaroo Island area was incorporated into the (08) 855x xxxx number range with a significant change to subscriber numbers (for example (0848) 21000 became (08) 8553 4000).

In order to prevent incorrect connections during the changeover period, a number which would otherwise have the first digits of its old form the same as the first digits of its new form had to be changed. For example, (043) 43 2123 may be confused with (02) 4321 2345 (which would be used for (043) 21 2345) during the change. To prevent this, before the change to eight digits, the local number was changed, so that, in the example, (043) 43 2123 would become (043) 44 2123, and then (02) 4344 2123. A list of all numbers changed in this way is shown in the table below.

See also
Telephone numbers in Australia

References

ITU allocations list

External links
 8-digit numbering on the official ACMA website
 Full list of changes

 
History of telecommunications in Australia